The Battle of Philippeville, also known as the Philippeville massacre or the August Offensive was a series of raids launched on 20 August 1955 on various cities and towns of the Constantine region by FLN insurgents and armed mobs during the Algerian War between France and Algerian rebels. The raids, which mostly took the form of ethnic riots, resulted in the massacre, in extremely gruesome ways, of several dozens of European settlers known as Pieds-Noirs. These massacres were then followed by very brutal and blind reprisals by the French army and Pieds-Noirs vigilantes, which resulted in the death of several thousand native Algerians. The events of late August 1955 in the Constantinois region are considered to be a major turning point of the Algerian War.

Background
The Algerian War began on the 1st of November 1954, when the FLN launched "scores of scores of spectacular attacks". The conflict quickly escalated, as evidenced by the remarks of the Socialist Minister of the Interior, François Mitterrand: "I will not agree to negotiate with the enemies of the homeland. The only negotiation is war!" The French adopted an increasingly aggressive policy in Algeria and in early March 1955 the French government of Prime Minister Pierre Mendès France was replaced by that of Edgar Faure.                                                                                               
 
By summer 1955, the steady pressure of French counter-insurgency had put the FLN in a very dire situation. Only one of the FLN's sections, Wilaya II, was capable of mounting any offensive. Popular support for the FLN was still rather low and many of the Algerian Muslim elite advocated for a peaceful resolution of the conflict through conciliatory agreements with the French government.                     
 
To put the FLN in a stronger position, Youcef Zighoud, leader of the Wilaya II, decided to conduct an attack against Pieds-Noirs civilians in Algeria, with the hope that an aggressive French retaliation would break the fragile bond between French colonists and native Algerians, increasing the popular support for the rebellion and destroying any possibility for a conciliatory settlement of the conflict.

The French military learned about Zighoud's plans when one of General Aussaresses's informants, an Arab baker in Philippeville, told Aussaresses that he used to sell, on average, a sack of flour every three days, but was now selling two tons of flour every day to men whom he did not know and who paid only cash. From this, Aussaresses deduced that the spike in flour sales must have been because the FLN was concentrating men in the hills above Philippeville, which could only mean an operation was due to start soon.

FLN's attack
On 20 August 1955, a few hundred FLN members gathered crowds of several thousand local Muslim civilians, influenced by religious and racial motivations. False rumors were spread of an imminent landing by Egyptian troops and the Muslim groups were directed towards various settlements of the Contantinois area in a series of coordinated raids.

Raid on Philippeville
The main attack was conducted on the city of Philippeville, now known as Skikda. A large mob of several thousands civilians led by FLN members launched a general assault on the city, with the aim of attacking Europeans and moderate Muslim personalities and taking over the police station's weaponry. Only half of the insurgents were armed with firearms, while the rest carried farming tools, knives or makeshift bombs device. As the mob arrived in the city, Europeans in the streets were murdered on sight. However, the reaction of police forces and French army paratroopers was swift and the insurrection was soon defeated. 14 police officers were killed during this crackdown. Once the assault was over, the bodies of over a hundred insurgents were found in the streets, with many more captured by French forces.

El-Halia mine massacre
The largest massacre of the day occurred at the El-Halia pyrite-mining town, where about 130 Europeans and 2,000 Muslims lived and worked together. The mob was composed of hundreds of Muslims, both men and women, mostly armed with farming tools, axes, sharpened shovels, or knives, and was led by 25 FLN members. They arrived at about 11 am, when most of the Pied Noir men were working in the mine while women and children were at home. A bloody massacre ensued; European women were raped and disembowelled or decapitated, children had their throats slit, and babies were slammed against walls. Some of the local Muslim inhabitants who had initially watched without reacting eventually joined the excited mob, as it massacred Europeans under chants of 'Allah Akabar' that blended with Algerian women's ululations. Thirty-seven Europeans, mostly women and children, were murdered in the attack.

Attack on El Khroub military outpost
Near El Khroub, a crowd of a few hundred ill-armed Muslim civilians, including women and children, led by a few FLN members, launched an assault on a French military outpost held by 150 soldiers. Their goal was to kill the garrison in order to take over the heavy weapons and ammunitions stock. The attack was repulsed without any French casualties, while 12 uniform-wearing FLN members, 15 civilian men, 19 women, and 11 children or teenagers were killed.

Terror attacks in Constantine
In Constantine, eight FLN commandos of about ten men each launched a series of terror attacks on a number of specific targets. Allouah Abbas, nephew of Ferhat Abbas and a moderate local politician who had advocated for conciliation with the French government, was murdered in the pharmacy he owned. Chérif Hadj-Saïd, another prominent moderate politician, was also shot but survived. Local police inspector Robert Laemmel was assassinated in front of a cafe. Grenades were thrown at a police station, and a movie theater and a restaurant were bombed. Several bombs exploded in the Jewish area of the city, killing two and wounding dozens.

Other attacks
Smaller scale attacks on Europeans also took place in various villages of the region. In Aïn Abid, Bernadette Mello, a 5-day old newborn, was cut into pieces in front of her mother whose belly then was opened to stuff the pieces back inside. In Ramdane Djamel, 13 Europeans were murdered. In Collo, 4 policemen and 6 European civilians were killed. The car of a Jewish family was stopped by the mob on a road near Ramdane Djamel. Haïm Benchetrit was forcibly pulled out of the vehicle, before being castrated and choked to death with his own genitals in front of his wife and their three children, aged 11, 5 and 3, who were then killed.

French retaliation
After the initial shock of the attacks, French reprisals began. A number of Algerian men arrested during or after the attacks were executed without trial. When French paratroopers arrived at El-Halia a few hours after the attack, they rounded up about 80 Algerian men present on the site and shot them without any further investigation. At El Khroub, 60 insurgents captured during the attack were shot on the same day, while many other men were arrested based on suspicions and shot in the following days.
In the following days, several shepherd villages, suspected to be harbouring FLN members or to have taken part in the attacks, were razed by the French air force.
The total death toll of the French reprisals is uncertain (estimates vary from 1,200 to 12,000) but as at  Setif 10 years earlier, the number of Algerians killed in retaliation for the initial massacre of Europeans was disproportionate. French anticolonial militant Daniel Guérin estimated the number of men executed in Philippeville proper at 2,000. A French military report gave a number of 750 men executed in the El Harrouch area.

Philippeville stadium scandal
In Philippeville, the city's stadium was turned into an interrogation center by the French army.
Due to the nature of the assault (mainly conducted by civilians without uniforms), the French army rounded up a large number of Algerian males present in the streets during the attack, without attempting to distinguish uninvolved inhabitants from insurgents guilty of involvement in the initial attacks on Pied Noir civilians. These men were briefly interrogated at the stadium before being executed without any proper investigation or trial. French reporter Robert Lambotte took a photograph depicting the lined up bodies of executed Algerians in the stadium and published it in the newspaper L'Humanité, sparking national outrage in France.

Pieds-Noirs vigilante reprisals
Shocked and enraged by the atrocities inflicted upon European civilians, some of the Pieds-Noirs began forming vigilante militas. The mayor of Philippeville Paul-Dominique Benquet-Crevaux armed the militias, which soon started exercising random reprisals upon indigenous Algerians, killing dozens. After the funerals of the victims ended, seven Algerians were lynched in the streets. The fact that some of the anti-European atrocities had been committed by trusted Muslim neighbors, alongside whom the victims had lived for years, created widespread paranoia among the Pied-Noir community, some of soon started seeing every Muslim as a potential attacker. Fearing for their safety, armed vigilantes fired at any Muslim whose behavior they deemed suspicious, killing or wounding many innocents. In one incident a group of Pieds-Noir vigilantes got involved in a firefight with French soldiers they had mistaken for FLN rebels, which prompted French authorities to start disarming vigilantes.

Death toll
The total death toll of the late August Constantinois attacks is uncertain. On the day of the attacks, French authorities gave an official figure of 71 European civilians, 21 native Algerian civilians and 31 law enforcement officers killed by insurgents during the FLN's actions. However, many survivors were severely wounded or maimed, and some later died of their wounds. Historian Roger Vétillard gave a total figure of 117 European civilians, 42 Algerian civilians and 47 law enforcers who ultimately died as a result of the 20 August FLN's attacks.                                           
 
The death toll of French retaliations remains heavily disputed. French authorities gave an official figure of 1,273 native Algerians killed, which is widely considered to be underestimated. The FLN claimed that as many as 12,000 were killed by French repression. French historian and Colonial Algeria specialist Charles-Robert Ageron estimated the number of native Algerians killed as a result of French retaliations to be between 3,000 and 5,000.

Aftermath

The events of 20 August 1955 are widely considered to be a major turning point in the Algerian War. Just as Zighoud intended, the massacre of the Pieds-Noirs, followed by the violent French reprisals, created an irreparable divide between the European and the native communities. The peaceful "third way" was no longer an option, and many former moderates on both sides ended up forced to choose unambiguous positions. As such, the operation was thus considered a great success by Zighoud despite the failure to take the much-needed weapons from the targeted military outposts and police stations, and despite the relatively small number of Europeans killed in comparison to the Algerian death toll.                                                     
 
Despite the undeniable political success of the operation, Zighoud's cynical disregard for Algerian lives was frowned upon by several high-ranking members of the FLN. Abane Ramdane and Larbi Ben M'hidi notably criticized his decision to send barely armed Algerian civilians with almost no weapons to a certain death for a result of less than 100 Europeans killed. Ramdane also condemned the murder and mutilation of European babies, which he feared would cause the revolution to be associated with fanatical madness and decrease international support for the cause of Algerian independence.                                                                                     
 
Three weeks after the event, a group of sixty-one prominent Algerian Muslim politicians, who had thus far adopted moderate positions and who used to believe it was possible for Algerians to become French by adopting the French language, wrote a public declaration "condemning the blind repression" in Philippeville, declared the French government's policy of integration of Algerian Muslims to be a failure, and wrote that, in the wake of the blind and bloody repression against Muslims in Philippeville, the vast majority of Algerians had become nationalists who now believed in the "idée nationale algérienne" ("Algerian national ideal"). By late 1955, the number of FLN fighters in the Constantine region had increased by a threefold.                                                              
 
Jacques Soustelle, the recently appointed Governor of Algeria, who had thus far defended conciliatory approach on Algerian nationalism, was profoundly traumatized by his visit at the El-Halia mine after the attacks. After the events of late August 1955, he became convinced that no negotiation was possible with 'FLN terrorists', and would keep getting increasingly radicalized as the war progressed.                                               
 
French Pied-Noir intellectual Albert Camus, who had written several articles to bring attention on the condition of native Algerians, was appalled by the horrific massacre of European children, and completely rejected the FLN as terrorists. As he later wrote: "If I can understand and admire freedom fighters, I have only disgust for murderers of women and children".    
 
After August 1955, the brutality of the Algerian War dramatically increased in intensity, and atrocities on both sides became commonplace as FLN rebels and the French army became more and more radicalized.

References

Bibliography
 
 

Philippeville
Massacres of ethnic groups
Massacres in Algeria
August 1955 events in Africa
Mass murder in 1955
Algerian war crimes
French war crimes
Racially motivated violence against white people in Africa